Tamira Paszek was the defending champion, but retired in the first round with a thigh injury against Caroline Wozniacki.

Elena Vesnina won the title, defeating Jamie Hampton in the final 6–2, 6–1.

Seeds

Draw

Finals

Top half

Bottom half

Qualifying

Seeds

Qualifiers

Lucky loser

Draw

First qualifier

Second qualifier

Third qualifier

Fourth qualifier

References
 Main Draw
 Qualifying Draw

Aegon Internationalandnbsp;- Singles
2013 Women's Singles